Cypress Lake Preserve is a  nature preserve in Ridge Manor, Florida. The preserve is located in the vicinity of US 98/SR 50 and Ridge Manor Boulevard in Ridge Manor, Florida.

Cypress Lake Preserve has two signs. One of which is on Paul N. Steckle Drive between the Withlacoochee River and a Hernando County Firehouse, and the other on Ridge Manor Boulevard across from the intersection with Olancha Road.

References

Parks in Hernando County, Florida